Australasian Psychiatry is a peer-reviewed medical journal that covers the field of psychiatry. The editor-in-chief is Vlasios Brakoulias. It was established in 1993 and is published by SAGE Publications on behalf of the Royal Australian and New Zealand College of Psychiatrists.

Editors
The following persons have been or are editor-in-chief:
Harry Minas (1993-2000)
Garry Walter (2001-2013)
Vlasios Brakoulias (2014–present)

Abstracting and indexing
The journal is abstracted and indexed in:
EBSCO databases
Embase
MEDLINE/PubMed
ProQuest databases
PsycINFO
Science Citation Index Expanded
Scopus
According to the Journal Citation Reports, the journal has a 2018 impact factor of 0.943.

References

External links

SAGE Publishing academic journals
English-language journals
Bimonthly journals
Psychiatry journals
Publications established in 1993